Sherry Cola (born November 10, 1989) is an American comedian and actress. She played Alice Kwan in Freeform's Good Trouble.

Early life
Cola was born in Shanghai, China and later moved to Temple City, California. Her parents ran a restaurant in San Gabriel, California.

Cola attended California State University, Fullerton for seven years, saying about that time, "I didn’t have my shit together, frankly". At CSU Fullerton, she did campus radio and after graduation, she worked at 97.1 FM.

Career
Cola later got a segment on Carson Daly's radio show. She later began pursuing comedy by taking Upright Citizens Brigade classes and doing stand-up comedy.

She got her break in television in 2017 after landing a seven-episode appearance on Amazon Prime Video' I Love Dick.

Personal life
Cola is bisexual. She was a Grand Marshal at San Francisco Pride 2022.

Filmography

Film

Television

References

External links 
 

20th-century births
Living people
Year of birth uncertain
American actresses of Chinese descent
American comedians of Asian descent
California State University, Fullerton alumni
Chinese LGBT actors
American LGBT actors
American LGBT people of Asian descent
Bisexual actresses